Fantastic Beasts: Cases From the Wizarding World is a 2016 hidden object video game developed by Mediatonic and WB Games San Francisco, and published by Warner Bros. Interactive Entertainment.

The game was released for Android and iOS on November 17, 2016. It was removed from the App Store and Google Play on December 10, 2019, and was officially closed on January 14, 2020.

Gameplay
In Fantastic Beasts: Cases From the Wizarding World, the player controls a new recruit of the Beast Division in the Department for the Regulation and Control of Magical Creatures of the Ministry of Magic. Visiting locations like Diagon Alley, Hogsmeade and The Leaky Cauldron, the player investigate unexplained happenings by discovering hidden objects, analyzing evidence, casting spells and brewing potions, to uncover and protect the magical creatures at the center of every mysterious case.

Development
The game was developed by British studio Mediatonic in partnership with WB Games San Francisco. Developers of the game visited Warner Bros. Studio Tour London – The Making of Harry Potter to replicate as close as they could get objects appearing in the Harry Potter film series.

Release
The game was released for Android and iOS on November 17, 2016. It was released a day before the theatrical release of the film Fantastic Beasts and Where to Find Them.

References

2016 video games
Android (operating system) games
Mobile games
Casual games
Harry Potter video games
Warner Bros. video games
IOS games
Hidden object games
Single-player video games
Video games developed in the United Kingdom
Video games developed in the United States
Video games set in London
Video games set in England
Video games set in Scotland
Video games set in Wales
Fantastic Beasts